Diego Manuel Bernal (born October 19, 1976) is a Democratic member of the Texas House of Representatives representing District 123. He was sworn into office on March 3, 2015, after winning a special election on February 17, 2015. Bernal previously served as a member of the San Antonio City Council.

Sponsored legislation
In December 2016, Bernal filed SB 220, which would prohibit openly carrying guns into mental health facilities.

References

External links
Legislative page
 Diego Bernal at the Texas Tribune

Living people
Democratic Party members of the Texas House of Representatives
Hispanic and Latino American state legislators in Texas
University of Michigan alumni
21st-century American politicians
1976 births